Khyātivāda (Sanskrit: ख्यातिवादाः) is the term used to refer to the Indian Theories of Perceptual Error – khyāti (ख्यातिः) besides referring to 'fame', 'renown' etc., in Samkhya philosophy refers to the 'erroneous conception' (of the Atman) or 'false apprehension', and vāda means - 'proposition', 'discourse', 'argument'. These are all theories that deal with the nature of the object of illusory perception and not with the nature of the subject, whether the error consists in the object or in the subject’s cognition. There are five principal theories dealing with perceptual errors, which are:-

1)	Asat-khyātivāda (apprehension of the non-existent) (buddhism) – error in considering the unreal(non existent)to be real.in madhyamika buddhism error means describing the ultimate reality to be either real,unreal or both real and unreal or neither real and unreal.
2)	Ātma-khyātivāda (self-apprehension) (Yogacārā Buddhism) – it is the mental state projected outside as a mental image, the error occurs owing to the externalization of inner thoughts, by treating the internal object as external (extra-mental) and the error exists not in the object but in the subject.
3)	Akhyātivāda (non-apprehension) (Prabhākara Mīmāṃsā) – the error is due to the failure to distinguish between perception and memory, it is due to the lack of right discrimination vis-à-vis memory.
4)	Anyathā-khyātivāda (misapprehension) (Nyāya) – the object perceived under illusion is real elsewhere, not here in front of the perceiver because of the mind connected with the object on account of memory, the error is due to wrong understanding of the presented and the represented, and occurs, as Vachaspati Mishra states -  सदन्तरं सदन्तरात्मना गृह्यते - when "one reality is mistaken for another".
5)	Anirvacanīya-khyātivāda (apprehension of the indescribable) (Advaita) – the object is neither existent (सत्) nor non-existent (असत्) but indescribable (अनिर्वचनियम्), the illusory object is a product of ignorance (avidyā) about the substratum and the error is caused due to Maya which is also indescribable.

An understanding of what is true and what is untrue is an integral part of philosophical study for acquisition of highest knowledge. Knowledge presupposes a subject of that knowledge and also the object corresponding to it. The nature of knowledge however depends upon the mind and the cognitive faculties of the subject as also on the conditions in which the object is situated in relation to the subject; an error is caused due to a peculiar relation formed by the perceiver and the position of the object. Inference, a valid mode of cognition, is based on previous perception, and an erroneous perception negates the value of perception. The first three of the afore-listed five theories admit that the object perceived illusorily is, in one way or the other, existent; the remaining two, do not accept this contention.

Shankara explains that in Sampat Upasana there is the imposing (aropa) of a superior character on the inferior whereas in Pratika (adhyasa) Upasana the inferior form is contemplated as Brahman. Āropa  or illusion is 'mis-cognition' (avidyā), 'mis-appearance' (avabhāsa), 'superimposition' (adhyāsa), a 'misapplication' or a 'mis-presentation' which is not consciously persuaded unlike misperception and misunderstanding; and in which, neither the agent nor the subject have any active role to play. But, Aropa is not Adhyasa because there has to be an appearance which can make the delusive illusory appearance of a particular appearance a distinct possibility. Badarayana states that:-

 पराभिध्यानातु तिरोहितं ततो ह्यस्य बन्धविपर्ययौ |

 "From the meditation on the supreme Lord, however, becomes manifest that which remains obscured; because the soul’s bondage and freedom are derived from Him." - (Brahma Sutras III.ii.5)

which is so because bondage comes from the ignorance about the nature of God, and freedom comes from the knowledge of His reality when as a result of meditation on Him (with attributes) comes unsurpassable divinity and one becomes the Absolute with all the desires fulfilled. (Shvetashvatara Upanishad I.11). And that:-

 अत एव चोपमा सूर्यकादिवत् |

 "Hence also are the illustrations of the sun’s reflection (in water) etc." – (Brahma Sutras III.ii.19)

which statement, Shankara explains, means that the one with attributes created by limiting adjuncts is not real but though One and present in all beings is seen as many.

Aropa can be verbal (śabdi), and it can also be based upon sense (arthi) (meaning or implied), sometimes it is not expressed but is conveyed. Advaita Vedanta does not view the world of existence as an absolute reality, it is an imposition (aropa), it simply does not exist from the absolute standpoint; it is  Anatman  which the  Atman  accepts as a device for the purpose of self-realization, and for experiencing Divine Unity, the inseparableness of Atman and Anatman.

The Dvaita School of Madhavacharya does not accept the Advaita illusionistic hypothesis or interpretation of reality as being deceptive and merely appearance-interpreting. Jayatirtha, while discussing Khyātivāda, rejects Prabhākara’s view of the fusion of two cognitions i.e. fusion of percept and memory, resulting in illusory cognition.

Khyātivāda is based on the assumption that misperception is not simply the human failure to perceive correctly but is something which occurs due to some peculiar special circumstances, and that cognition can be either correct (pratyaksha) or incorrect (apratyaksha) depending upon the cognizing activity of the mind. Its theories are concerned with the nature of the object which is erroneously cognized and whose ontological status they logically examine.

References 

Vedas
Vedanta
Advaita Vedanta
Dvaita Vedanta
Sanskrit words and phrases